Diocese of Manchester may refer to:

Anglican Diocese of Manchester in England
Roman Catholic Diocese of Manchester in the United States